Darren Carl Huckerby (born 23 April 1976) is an English football coach and former professional footballer. 

As a player, he was a forward who notably played in the Premier League for Newcastle United, Coventry City, Leeds United, Manchester City and Norwich City. He also featured for Lincoln City, Millwall and Nottingham Forest. He finished his career by playing in the United States in Major League Soccer for San Jose Earthquakes. He was capped once at England B level.

Following retirement, he had a spell as academy coach for the Under 16s of former club Norwich City.

Club career

Lincoln City
Huckerby was born in Nottingham, England. His mother is of partial Georgian descent. Huckerby started playing professionally for Lincoln City in Football League Division Three. Huckerby was promoted to the first team at Sincil Bank by Keith Alexander, but also played under the stewardship of both Sam Ellis and Steve Wicks before being sold in 1995. He finished his spell with Lincoln having scored 5 goals in 28 league appearances.

Newcastle United
Huckerby made a three division step up by signing for Premier League title contenders Newcastle United in a £400,000 deal in 1995. Despite being highly rated by the fans and pundits, Huckerby found first team chances severely limited, especially since manager Kevin Keegan decided to scrap the reserve team, in response to a requirement from the FA  that a certain percentage of home reserve fixtures be played at St James' Park. Keegan believed that this would negatively affect the pitch condition, which was already in poor state. This of course meant that, with no reserve team football, Huckerby was not match fit for the majority of his time on Tyneside. Huckerby made only two appearances for the Magpies (one in the league and one in the FA Cup), before being loaned out to Millwall. Huckerby then joined Coventry City for £1 million in time for the start of the next season, signed by then City boss Gordon Strachan.

Coventry City
The striker's pace and dribbling ability, combined with a very successful partnership with Dion Dublin saw Huckerby play a key role at Coventry. Huckerby and Dublin's partnership did not go unnoticed and earned Huckerby a call up to the England B squad, whilst Dublin managed call ups to the full squad, under Glenn Hoddle. Huckerby played a major role in Coventry's Premier League survival,  culminating with a final day 2–1 win at Tottenham Hotspur in 1997. His success with the Sky Blues continued throughout the following season as Coventry enjoyed a ten-game unbeaten run and reached the quarter finals of the FA Cup, narrowly losing on penalties to Sheffield United. Huckerby scored several goals, most notably the winner in a 3–2 victory over Manchester United at Highfield Road, a dazzling run past a few defenders before slotting past Kevin Pilkington. He notched up 14 goals that season, his best Premier League return of goals.

Leeds United
He was sold to Leeds United the following summer for a reputed £6 million. In his time at Elland Road, he scored two goals in 40 league games, once against former club Coventry City and another against Watford. He had to compete for a place in the team with some players such as Mark Viduka, Alan Smith and Michael Bridges and as a result he was never a regular, although he did score against Partizan Belgrade in the 1999–2000 UEFA Cup, and in a 6–0 win against Beşiktaş in the 2000–01 Champions League. In all competitions, he scored six goals in total.

Manchester City
Manchester City signed him in December 2000 for £3.38 million, as they attempted to avoid relegation. Huckerby scored on his debut against Charlton Athletic, albeit in a 4-1 defeat. Although the club did eventually go down, he stayed on and won a First Division championship medal, adding 26 goals in all competitions during the campaign, including two hat-tricks.

Huckerby started the new campaign as first choice, and scored the team's first goal of the season, a header against former employer Newcastle that secured a 1–0 win. However, the arrivals of Nicolas Anelka and Jon Macken meant less playing time, and he eventually ended up playing out the end of the season on-loan to Nottingham Forest, being part of the team that reached the Division One playoffs in 2003.

Norwich City
Huckerby spent a three-month loan spell with Norwich City, before signing permanently in December 2003, for a fee of £750,000, which rose to £1 million when the Canaries were promoted at the end of the season. At Norwich, Huckerby's career settled, and he netted 14 league goals in the First Division in the 2003–04 season. He was instrumental in Norwich's march to the First Division championship in 2003–04, and came second in the supporters vote for player of the season behind Craig Fleming.

Reverting to a left wing role for much of Norwich's Premier League spell in 2004–05, Huckerby scored seven goals. He was linked with a transfer to either Liverpool or Celtic the following summer, but spoke of his intention to see out his contract in East Anglia.

He was voted Norwich City player of the year by supporters in 2004–05 and 2006–07, and placed second behind Gary Doherty for the 2005–06 season, winning the award twice and adding two runner-up positions in his first four seasons. He was voted into the Norwich City Hall of Fame in 2004. On 13 April 2008, he played his 200th game for Norwich, in the East Anglian Derby against Ipswich Town.

On 4 May 2008, Huckerby scored in his final game for the club in a 4–1 defeat away at Sheffield Wednesday. Two days later, it was announced that his contract would not be renewed as he could not be guaranteed a place in the first team in the 2008–09 season. This upset fans who felt that Huckerby, a fan favourite, deserved a proper farewell. However, an opportunity was made with a special tribute at a 'Greatest Ever' event at Carrow Road held later in May.

In 2012, Huckerby returned to Carrow Road to play in Adam Drury's testimonial match against Celtic, coming on in the 76th minute showing his trademark bursts of pace and skill. Former Celtic and Norwich striker John Hartson who was co-commentating on Setanta Sports claimed he looked fit and sharp enough still to be playing professionally.

San Jose Earthquakes
Huckerby moved to the United States joining Major League Soccer club, San Jose Earthquakes in July 2008. MLS rules at the time dictated that Toronto FC owned the right to sign Huckerby. To acquire those rights, San Jose traded allocation money and use of an international roster slot for the 2008 through 2013 seasons to Toronto.

He made his debut on 19 July 2008 against Toronto, in a 0–0 draw, and scored his first goal against New York Red Bulls on 27 July. In a crucial match for the Earthquakes, on 3 August 2008, Huckerby scored his second goal, against Los Angeles Galaxy, in a 3–2 Earthquakes win. On 30 August, he headed in the winning goal in the side's 2–1 victory over Kansas City Wizards, extending San Jose's unbeaten streak to seven games. During this stretch, Huckerby notched three goals and three assists.

On 11 November 2008, it was announced that Huckerby had won the 2008 MLS Newcomer of the Year Award.

During the 2009 Major League Soccer season, Huckerby underwent surgery to eliminate his hip injury. However, on 16 September 2009, at age 33, Huckerby announced that he was '99% sure' of his retirement.

International career
Huckerby made one appearance with the England B team in 1998.

Coaching career
He is a former academy coach for the Under 16s at Premier League side Norwich City.

Personal life
Huckerby lives in Keswick, south Norfolk. His son Tom is also a footballer, currently playing for Wroxham.

After retiring from football in 2009, Huckerby returned to playing football in the Masters Tournament in June 2011 in which he scored 8 goals in the Yorkshire Masters for his old club Leeds United. In the Grand Masters final Huckerby added a further 6 goals to his tally, making him overall tournament golden boot winner with 14 goals. Leeds were overall runners up in the tournament, losing 8–3 to Rangers in the final.

On 14 April 2013, Huckerby played in a charity game at Lowestoft Town's Crown Meadow ground. He played for the ex professionals against a select eleven which included students from Lowestoft College.

Career statistics

Honours
First Division: 2001–02
First Division: 2003–04
Norwich City player of the year: 2005, 2007
Major League Soccer player of the month: September 2008
2008 Major League Soccer Newcomer of the Year

References

External links

 The Official Darren Huckerby Website
 Darren Huckerby Trust
 

Living people
1976 births
People from Keswick, South Norfolk
British people of Georgian descent
English footballers
Footballers from Nottingham
Association football forwards
England B international footballers
Premier League players
English Football League players
Major League Soccer players
Lincoln City F.C. players
Newcastle United F.C. players
Millwall F.C. players
Coventry City F.C. players
Leeds United F.C. players
Manchester City F.C. players
Nottingham Forest F.C. players
Norwich City F.C. players
San Jose Earthquakes players
English expatriate sportspeople in the United States
Expatriate soccer players in the United States
English expatriate footballers